A Fourier series is an expansion of a periodic function into a sum of trigonometric functions.  The Fourier series is an example of a trigonometric series, but not all trigonometric series are Fourier series. By expressing a function as a sum of sines and cosines, many problems involving the function become easier to analyze because trigonometric functions are well understood. For example, Fourier series were first used by Joseph Fourier to find solutions to the heat equation. This application is possible because the derivatives of trigonometric functions fall into simple patterns. Fourier series cannot be used to approximate arbitrary functions, because most functions have infinitely many terms in their Fourier series, and the series do not always converge. Well-behaved functions, for example smooth functions, have Fourier series that converge to the original function.  The coefficients of the Fourier series are determined by integrals of the function multiplied by trigonometric functions, described in Common forms of the Fourier series below.

The study of the convergence of Fourier series focus on the behaviors of the partial sums, which means studying the behavior of the sum as more and more terms from the series are summed. The figures below illustrate some partial Fourier series results for the components of a square wave.

Fourier series are closely related to the Fourier transform, which can be used to find the frequency information for functions that are not periodic. The Fourier transform is also part of Fourier Analysis, but is defined for functions on 

Since Fourier's time, many different approaches to defining and understanding the concept of Fourier series have been discovered, all of which are consistent with one another, but each of which emphasizes different aspects of the topic. Some of the more powerful and elegant approaches are based on mathematical ideas and tools that were not available in Fourier's time. Fourier originally defined the Fourier series for real-valued functions of real arguments, and used the sine and cosine functions in the decomposition. Many other Fourier-related transforms have since been defined, extending his initial idea to many applications and birthing an area of mathematics called Fourier analysis.

Common forms of the Fourier series
The Fourier series can be represented in different forms. The sine-cosine form, exponential form, and amplitude-phase form   are expressed here for a periodic function .

Sine-cosine form 
The Fourier series coefficients are defined by the integrals:

It is notable that,  is the average value of the function . This is a property that extends to similar transforms such as the Fourier transform.

With these coefficients defined the Fourier series is: 

Example

Consider a sawtooth function:

In this case, the Fourier coefficients are given by

This is a particular instance of the Dirichlet theorem for Fourier series.

This example leads to a solution of the Basel problem.

Exponential form 
It is possible to simplify the integrals for the Fourier series coefficients by using Euler's formula.

With the definitions 

By substituting equation  into  it can be shown that:

With these definitions the Fourier series is written as:

This is the customary form for generalizing to Complex-valued functions. Negative values of  correspond to negative frequency.  (Also see ).

Amplitude-phase form 
The Fourier series in amplitude-phase form is:

 is sometimes called the  harmonic or DC component.

Clearly  can represent functions that are just a sum of one or more of the harmonic frequencies.  The remarkable thing, for those not yet familiar with this concept, is that it can also represent the intermediate frequencies and/or non-sinusoidal functions because of the potentially infinite number of terms.

For a general frequency  and an analysis interval  the cross-correlation function:

is essentially a matched filter, with template . Here  denotes   If  is -periodic,  is arbitrary, often chosen to be  or   But in general, the Fourier series can also be used to represent a non-periodic function on just a finite interval, as depicted in Fig.1.

Figure 2 is an example, where  is a square wave (not shown), and frequency  is the  harmonic. It is also an example of deriving the maximum from just two samples, instead of searching the entire function. That is made possible by a trigonometric identity:
Combining this with  gives:

Extensions to non-periodic functions

Fourier series can also be applied to functions that are not necessarily periodic. The simplest extension occurs when the function  is defined only in a fixed interval . In this case the integrals defining the Fourier coefficients can be taken over this interval. In this case, it is possible to see Gibbs phenomenon at the end points of the interval.

For both the cases above, it is sometimes desirable to take an even or odd reflection of the function, or extend it by zero in the case the function is only defined on a finite interval.  This allows one to prescribe desired properties for the Fourier coefficients. For example, by making the function even you ensure .  This is often known as a cosine series. One may similarly arrive at a sine series.

In the case where the function doesn't have compact support and is defined on entire real line, one can use the Fourier transform.  Fourier series can be taken for a truncated version of the function or to the periodic summation.

Partial Sum Operator 
Frequently when describe how Fourier series behave, authors introduce the partial sum operator  for a function .

Unlike series in calculus, it is important that the partial sums are taken symmetrically for Fourier series, otherwise convergence results may not hold.

Convergence 

In engineering applications, the Fourier series is generally assumed to converge except at jump discontinuities since the functions encountered in engineering are better-behaved than functions encountered in other disciplines. If a function is square-integrable on the interval , then the Fourier series converges to the function at almost everywhere. It is possible to define Fourier coefficients for more general functions or distributions, in which case point wise convergence often fails, and convergence in norm or weak convergence is usually studied.

Other common notations
The notation  is inadequate for discussing the Fourier coefficients of several different functions.

In engineering, particularly when the variable  represents time, the coefficient sequence is called a frequency domain representation. Square brackets are often used to emphasize that the domain of this function is a discrete set of frequencies.

Another commonly used frequency domain representation uses the Fourier series coefficients to modulate a Dirac comb:

where  represents a continuous frequency domain. When variable  has units of seconds,  has units of hertz.

The constructed function  is therefore commonly referred to as a Fourier transform, even though the Fourier integral of a periodic function is not convergent at the harmonic frequencies.

History

The Fourier series is named in honor of Jean-Baptiste Joseph Fourier (1768–1830), who made important contributions to the study of trigonometric series, after preliminary investigations by Leonhard Euler, Jean le Rond d'Alembert, and Daniel Bernoulli. Fourier introduced the series for the purpose of solving the heat equation in a metal plate, publishing his initial results in his 1807 Mémoire sur la propagation de la chaleur dans les corps solides (Treatise on the propagation of heat in solid bodies), and publishing his Théorie analytique de la chaleur (Analytical theory of heat) in 1822. The Mémoire introduced Fourier analysis, specifically Fourier series. Through Fourier's research the fact was established that an arbitrary (at first, continuous and later generalized to any piecewise-smooth) function can be represented by a trigonometric series. The first announcement of this great discovery was made by Fourier in 1807, before the French Academy. Early ideas of decomposing a periodic function into the sum of simple oscillating functions date back to the 3rd century BC, when ancient astronomers proposed an empiric model of planetary motions, based on deferents and epicycles.

The heat equation is a partial differential equation. Prior to Fourier's work, no solution to the heat equation was known in the general case, although particular solutions were known if the heat source behaved in a simple way, in particular, if the heat source was a sine or cosine wave. These simple solutions are now sometimes called eigensolutions. Fourier's idea was to model a complicated heat source as a superposition (or linear combination) of simple sine and cosine waves, and to write the solution as a superposition of the corresponding eigensolutions. This superposition or linear combination is called the Fourier series.

From a modern point of view, Fourier's results are somewhat informal, due to the lack of a precise notion of function and integral in the early nineteenth century. Later, Peter Gustav Lejeune Dirichlet and Bernhard Riemann expressed Fourier's results with greater precision and formality.

Although the original motivation was to solve the heat equation, it later became obvious that the same techniques could be applied to a wide array of mathematical and physical problems, and especially those involving linear differential equations with constant coefficients, for which the eigensolutions are sinusoids. The Fourier series has many such applications in electrical engineering, vibration analysis, acoustics, optics, signal processing, image processing, quantum mechanics, econometrics, shell theory, etc.

Beginnings 
Joseph Fourier wrote:

This immediately gives any coefficient ak of the trigonometrical series for φ(y) for any function which has such an expansion. It works because if φ has such an expansion, then (under suitable convergence assumptions) the integral

can be carried out term-by-term. But all terms involving  for  vanish when integrated from −1 to 1, leaving only the  term.

In these few lines, which are close to the modern formalism used in Fourier series, Fourier revolutionized both mathematics and physics. Although similar trigonometric series were previously used by Euler, d'Alembert, Daniel Bernoulli and Gauss, Fourier believed that such trigonometric series could represent any arbitrary function. In what sense that is actually true is a somewhat subtle issue and the attempts over many years to clarify this idea have led to important discoveries in the theories of convergence, function spaces, and harmonic analysis.

When Fourier submitted a later competition essay in 1811, the committee (which included Lagrange, Laplace, Malus and Legendre, among others) concluded: ...the manner in which the author arrives at these equations is not exempt of difficulties and...his analysis to integrate them still leaves something to be desired on the score of generality and even rigour.

Fourier's motivation

The Fourier series expansion of the sawtooth function (above) looks more complicated than the simple formula , so it is not immediately apparent why one would need the Fourier series. While there are many applications, Fourier's motivation was in solving the heat equation. For example, consider a metal plate in the shape of a square whose sides measure  meters, with coordinates .
 
Here, sinh is the hyperbolic sine function. While our example function  seems to have a needlessly complicated Fourier series, the heat distribution  is nontrivial. The function  cannot be written as a closed-form expression. This method of solving the heat problem was made possible by Fourier's work.

Complex Fourier series animation

An example of the ability of the complex Fourier series to trace any two dimensional closed figure is shown in the adjacent animation of the complex Fourier series tracing the letter 'e' (for exponential). Note that the animation uses the variable 't' to parameterize the letter 'e' in the complex plane, which is equivalent to using the parameter 'x' in this article's subsection on complex valued functions.

In the animation's back plane, the rotating vectors are aggregated in an order that alternates between a vector rotating in the positive (counter clockwise) direction and a vector rotating at the same frequency but in the negative (clockwise) direction, resulting in a single tracing arm with lots of zigzags. This perspective shows how the addition of each pair of rotating vectors (one rotating in the positive direction and one rotating in the negative direction) nudges the previous trace (shown as a light gray dotted line) closer to the shape of the letter 'e'.

In the animation's front plane, the rotating vectors are aggregated into two sets, the set of all the positive rotating vectors and the set of all the negative rotating vectors (the non-rotating component is evenly split between the two), resulting in two tracing arms rotating in opposite directions. The animation's small circle denotes the midpoint between the two arms and also the midpoint between the origin and the current tracing point denoted by '+'. This perspective shows how the complex Fourier series is an extension (the addition of an arm) of the complex geometric series which has just one arm. It also shows how the two arms coordinate with each other. For example, as the tracing point is rotating in the positive direction, the negative direction arm stays parked. Similarly, when the tracing point is rotating in the negative direction, the positive direction arm stays parked.

In between the animation's back and front planes are rotating trapezoids whose areas represent the values of the complex Fourier series terms. This perspective shows the amplitude, frequency, and phase of the individual terms of the complex Fourier series in relation to the series sum spatially converging to the letter 'e' in the back and front planes. The audio track's left and right channels correspond respectively to the real and imaginary components of the current tracing point '+' but increased in frequency by a factor of 3536 so that the animation's fundamental frequency (n=1) is a 220 Hz tone (A220).

Other applications
Another application is to solve the Basel problem by using Parseval's theorem. The example generalizes and one may compute ζ(2n), for any positive integer n.

Table of common Fourier series 
Some common pairs of periodic functions and their Fourier series coefficients are shown in the table below.

 designates a periodic function with period .
 designate the Fourier series coefficients (sine-cosine form) of the periodic function .

Table of basic properties 
This table shows some mathematical operations in the time domain and the corresponding effect in the Fourier series coefficients. Notation:
 Complex conjugation is denoted by an asterisk.
 designate -periodic functions or functions defined only for 

Symmetry properties 
When the real and imaginary parts of a complex function are decomposed into their even and odd parts, there are four components, denoted below by the subscripts RE, RO, IE, and IO. And there is a one-to-one mapping between the four components of a complex time function and the four components of its complex frequency transform:

From this, various relationships are apparent, for example:
The transform of a real-valued function is the even symmetric function .  Conversely, an even-symmetric transform implies a real-valued time-domain.
The transform of an imaginary-valued function is the odd symmetric function , and the converse is true.
The transform of an even-symmetric function is the real-valued function , and the converse is true.
The transform of an odd-symmetric function is the imaginary-valued function , and the converse is true.

Other properties

Riemann–Lebesgue lemma 
If  is integrable,  and  This result is known as the Riemann–Lebesgue lemma.

Parseval's theorem 

Plancherel's theorem 

If  are coefficients and  then there is a unique function  such that  for every .

Convolution theorems 

The periodic convolution:  is also -periodic, with Fourier series coefficients: 
See

Derivative property 
We say that  belongs to 
 If , then the Fourier coefficients  of the derivative  can be expressed in terms of the Fourier coefficients  of the function , via the formula .
 If , then .

Compact groups 

One of the interesting properties of the Fourier transform which we have mentioned, is that it carries convolutions to pointwise products. If that is the property which we seek to preserve, one can produce Fourier series on any compact group. Typical examples include those classical groups that are compact. This generalizes the Fourier transform to all spaces of the form L2(G), where G is a compact group, in such a way that the Fourier transform carries convolutions to pointwise products. The Fourier series exists and converges in similar ways to the  case.

An alternative extension to compact groups is the Peter–Weyl theorem, which proves results about representations of compact groups analogous to those about finite groups.

Riemannian manifolds 

If the domain is not a group, then there is no intrinsically defined convolution. However, if  is a compact Riemannian manifold, it has a Laplace–Beltrami operator. The Laplace–Beltrami operator is the differential operator that corresponds to Laplace operator for the Riemannian manifold . Since Fourier arrived at his basis by attempting to solve the heat equation, the natural generalization is to use the eigensolutions of the Laplace–Beltrami operator as a basis. This generalizes Fourier series to spaces of the type , where  is a Riemannian manifold. The Fourier series converges in ways similar to the  case. A typical example is to take  to be the sphere with the usual metric, in which case the Fourier basis consists of spherical harmonics.

Locally compact Abelian groups 

The generalization to compact groups discussed above does not generalize to noncompact, nonabelian groups. However, there is a straightforward generalization to Locally Compact Abelian (LCA) groups.

If  is compact, one also obtains a Fourier series, which converges similarly to the  case, but if  is noncompact, one obtains instead a Fourier integral.

Extensions

Fourier series on a square 

Aside from being useful for solving partial differential equations such as the heat equation, one notable application of Fourier series on the square is in image compression. In particular, the JPEG image compression standard uses the two-dimensional discrete cosine transform, a discrete form of the Fourier cosine transform, which uses only cosine as the basis function.

For two-dimensional arrays with a staggered appearance, half of the Fourier series coefficients disappear, due to additional symmetry.

Fourier series of Bravais-lattice-periodic-function 

A three-dimensional Bravais lattice is defined as the set of vectors of the form:

This kind of function can be, for example, the effective potential that one electron "feels" inside a periodic crystal. It is useful to make the Fourier series of the potential when applying Bloch's theorem. First, we may write any arbitrary position vector  in the coordinate-system of the lattice:

Thus we can define a new function,

This enables us to build up a set of Fourier coefficients, each being indexed by three independent integers . In what follows, we use function notation to denote these coefficients, where previously we used subscripts.

And then we can write:

Further defining:

We can write  once again as:

Finally applying the same for the third coordinate, we define:

We write  as:

Re-arranging:

Then for any arbitrary reciprocal lattice vector  and arbitrary position vector  in the original Bravais lattice space, their scalar product is:

where 

Assuming

which after some calculation and applying some non-trivial cross-product identities can be shown to be equal to:

(it may be advantageous for the sake of simplifying calculations, to work in such a rectangular coordinate system, in which it just so happens that  is parallel to the x axis,  lies in the xy-plane, and  has components of all three axes). In particular, we now know that

writing  for the volume element ; and where  is the primitive unit cell, thus,  is the volume of the primitive unit cell.

Hilbert space interpretation 

 where  is the complex conjugate of 
The basic Fourier series result for Hilbert spaces can be written as

This corresponds exactly to the complex exponential formulation given above. The version with sines and cosines is also justified with the Hilbert space interpretation. Indeed, the sines and cosines form an orthogonal set:

(where δmn is the Kronecker delta), and

furthermore, the sines and cosines are orthogonal to the constant function . The density of their span is a consequence of the Stone–Weierstrass theorem, but follows also from the properties of classical kernels like the Fejér kernel.

Fourier theorem proving convergence of Fourier series 

These theorems, and informal variations of them that don't specify the convergence conditions, are sometimes referred to generically as Fourier's theorem or the Fourier theorem.

The earlier   is a trigonometric polynomial of degree  that can be generally expressed as:

Least squares property
Parseval's theorem implies that:

Convergence theorems 

Because of the least squares property, and because of the completeness of the Fourier basis, we obtain an elementary convergence result.

We have already mentioned that if  is continuously differentiable, then  is the  Fourier coefficient of the derivative . It follows, essentially from the Cauchy–Schwarz inequality, that  is absolutely summable.

In the absolutely summable case, the inequality:

proves uniform convergence.

Divergence 
Since Fourier series have such good convergence properties, many are often surprised by some of the negative results. For example, the Fourier series of a continuous T-periodic function need not converge pointwise. The uniform boundedness principle yields a simple non-constructive proof of this fact.

In 1922, Andrey Kolmogorov published an article titled Une série de Fourier-Lebesgue divergente presque partout in which he gave an example of a Lebesgue-integrable function whose Fourier series diverges almost everywhere. He later constructed an example of an integrable function whose Fourier series diverges everywhere .

See also

 ATS theorem
 Dirichlet kernel
 Discrete Fourier transform
 Fast Fourier transform
 Fejér's theorem
 Fourier analysis
 Fourier sine and cosine series
 Fourier transform
 Gibbs phenomenon
 Half range Fourier series
 Laurent series – the substitution q = eix transforms a Fourier series into a Laurent series, or conversely. This is used in the q-series expansion of the j-invariant.
 Least-squares spectral analysis
 Multidimensional transform
 Spectral theory
 Sturm–Liouville theory
 Residue theorem integrals of f(z), singularities, poles

Notes

References

Further reading

 2003 unabridged republication of the 1878 English translation by Alexander Freeman of Fourier's work Théorie Analytique de la Chaleur, originally published in 1822.

Felix Klein, Development of mathematics in the 19th century. Mathsci Press Brookline, Mass, 1979. Translated by M. Ackerman from Vorlesungen über die Entwicklung der Mathematik im 19 Jahrhundert, Springer, Berlin, 1928.

 The first edition was published in 1935.

External links

 
Joseph Fourier